Sabah Tea Sdn Bhd (doing business as Sabah Tea) is the main tea company in the state of Sabah, Malaysia since 1973. Originally owned by Sabah Tea Sdn Bhd and Desa Tea Sdn Bhd, it is the largest tea producer in Borneo, with both domestic and international distribution especially after became part of the Yee Lee Corporation Bhd who increase the export both in locals and internationally.

History 

In 1976, the Sabah state government has gazetted a 6,200 acres of land in Kg Nalapak, Ranau to Rural Development Co-operation (Koperasi Pembangunan Desa) (KPD). The land was then converted into tea farm and on 26 April 1978, the farm was incorporated into the Sabah Tea Sdn Bhd with a subsidy from KPD to manage and operate. The farm opening was officiated by the Malaysian Prime Minister Mahathir Mohamad on 19 February 1984. In 1987, the management of the Sabah Tea has unite with British company, Tate & Lyle and the Commonwealth Development Corporation to reduce the financial burden on the government. Following the unification, Sabah Tea can contribute to the government in the farming industry as a measure of competitiveness with other tea plantation. However, since 1997, Yee Lee Corporation Bhd has taken the total share of Sabah Tea Sdn Bhd and Desa Tea Sdn Bhd, a company from West Malaysia of Ipoh, Perak that specialise in the manufacturing, export and sale of products on both local and international level.

See also 
 List of tea companies

Further reading 
 Daryl. Tea Garden with a Difference. Tourism Malaysia Blog. (archive link)

References

External links 
 
 

1973 establishments in Malaysia
Tea brands
Tea companies of Malaysia
Privately held companies of Malaysia
Malaysian brands
Food and drink companies established in 1973
Malaysian companies established in 1973